The Hale House, also known as the Hale Residence is located at 902 Tullis St, NE Olympia, Washington. The house is an American Queen Anne style Cottage and was built in 1882 for Captain Calvin Henry Hale and Pamela Case Hale. The house was placed on the National Register of Historic Places January 12, 1984.

History

1882 was also the year that the Hales had their house on Tullis Street built.  Captain Hale was only able to enjoy the house for five years.  He died on August 12, 1887.

See also
History of Olympia, Washington
History of Washington State
Queen Anne style architecture
Daniel R. Bigelow House
Bigelow Neighborhood
National Register of Historic Places listings in Thurston County, Washington

References

Olympia Historical Society

External links

Houses completed in 1882
Houses in Thurston County, Washington
Houses on the National Register of Historic Places in Washington (state)
National Register of Historic Places in Olympia, Washington
Queen Anne architecture in Washington (state)